Middletown High School is a public high school located in Middletown, Delaware, United States. It is one of two high schools in the Appoquinimink School District and serves students grades 9–12. It was previously located in what is now the Everett Meredith Middle School building. Originally opened in 1997, the current facility added a two-story wing in the summer of 2002, and an expansion of its cafeteria/lobby to create extra capacity.

Notable alumni
 Dwayne Henry (b. 1962), former MLB pitcher
 D. J. Hyde (b. 1978), professional wrestler
 Desmond Bryant (b. 1985), former NFL player
 Marquis Dendy (b. 1992), track and field athlete who qualified for both the 2016 Summer Olympics and the 2020 Summer Olympics
 Chad Kuhl (b. 1992), MLB pitcher for the Pittsburgh Pirates
 Chris Godwin (b. 1996), NFL player for the Tampa Bay Buccaneers and 2021 Super Bowl champion.
 Sherae'a Moore member of the Delaware House of Representatives

References

Middletown, Delaware
Public high schools in Delaware
High schools in New Castle County, Delaware
Buildings and structures in Middletown, Delaware
1929 establishments in Delaware
Educational institutions established in 1929

External links